The oil and gas industry in New Zealand explores and develops oil and gas fields, and produces and distributes petroleum products and natural gas.

In 2018, New Zealand's self-sufficiency in oil (mmbls production divided by consumption) was 17%, i.e. the country imports its petroleum product needs. All local oil production is exported as the New Zealand refinery is not suited to processing it. In 2018, 60 petajoules of crude were produced in New Zealand, 380 PJ of petroleum products imported (most of it crude), and 283 PJ consumed. The difference is exported or used for international travel (aviation fuel and similar).

Oil and gas are produced from 21 petroleum licenses / permits, all in the Taranaki basin.  The most important fields are Kapuni, Maui, Pohokura and Kupe. Exploration for oil and gas reserves includes the Great South Basin and offshore areas near Canterbury and Gisborne.

New Zealand had one oil refinery, the Marsden Point Oil Refinery, but its refining capability was closed in 2021 and is now an import only facility. The major industry body is the Petroleum Exploration and Production Association of New Zealand.

There are 2,600 kilometres of high-pressure natural gas transmission pipelines in the North Island. Most of these are owned and operated by First Gas, including the Maui pipeline, a 307 km pipeline that carries 78% of all natural gas produced in New Zealand. The low-pressure gas pipelines that distribute gas to end users are owned by First Gas (Northland, Waikato, Bay of Plenty, Gisborne, Kapiti Coast), Vector (Auckland), Powerco (Hawke's Bay, Taranaki, Manawatu, Wellington) and GasNet (Wanganui).

The largest retailers of gas are Contact Energy and Vector. There is no natural gas transmission in the South Island. New Zealand has one underground gas storage facility, the Ahuroa Gas Storage Facility.

History
In 1865, the Alpha well was drilled near Mikotahi at New Plymouth. This was the first oil well in what is now the Commonwealth and one of the first in the world. A petroleum industry developed at Moturoa, including producing wells and refineries. The last refinery there was closed in 1972.  The field continues to produce small quantities of oil.

The Kapuni gas field in South Taranaki was discovered in 1959 and brought into production in 1970. The North Island natural gas network started operating in 1970, initially supplying Kapuni gas to Auckland, Hamilton, New Plymouth, Wanganui, Palmerston North and Wellington. The off-shore Maui field was discovered in 1969 and brought into production in 1978. This supported the development of many large energy projects, including gas fired power stations at New Plymouth and Huntly, ammonia-urea plant at Kapuni, gas to methanol plant at Waitara and the synthetic petrol plant at Motunui.

In 2018, the government announced that no new permits would be issued for offshore oil exploration.

In 2021, the last of the deep sea oil and gas exploration permits outside Taranaki was surrendered. This was the Totara permit held by NZOG for an area in the Great South Basin of the south coast of the South Island.

Oil and gas fields

Proven and probable (2P or P50) reserves, ultimate and remaining, as at 1 January 2019

Producing fields

See also 
 Climate change in New Zealand
 Energy in New Zealand
 Oil and gas companies in New Zealand

References

Notes

Bibliography

External links 
 New Zealand Petroleum & Minerals, part of the Ministry of Business, Innovation and Employment
 1900s photos of oil wells, Auckland Council

Petroleum in New Zealand
Natural gas in New Zealand
New Z
New Zealand